The annual 2014 LKL All-star Game, was held on March 2, in Klaipėda. The format was slightly different from the previous contests: LKL teams were geographically divided into an eastern division and a western division. Players from teams of each conference then made up the respective All-Star team.

Divisions 
 Rytai (Eastern): Lietuvos rytas, Pieno žvaigždės, Nevėžis, Juventus, Lietkabelis
 Vakarai (Western): Žalgiris, TonyBet, Neptūnas, Šiauliai, Dzūkija, LSU–Atletas

Teams 

* replaced by Giedrius Staniulis, of BC Dzūkija.
** replaced by Artūras Jomantas, of BC Pieno žvaigždės, in starting line-up, and by Ryan Olander, of BC Lietkabelis, in the roster.

Coaches 
Aleksandar Petrović of Lietuvos rytas was chosen to coach Rytai team and Saulius Štombergas of Žalgiris was chosen to coach the Vakarai team.

Game

References 

Lietuvos krepšinio lyga All-Star Game
All Star